Surgeon & Author

Ned Abraham (born Nedeem Ibrahim on November 11, 1961)  was an Associate Professor of surgery at the Faculty of Medicine, University of New South Wales and is a general & colorectal surgeon, a clinical academic and a retired Australian Army Reserve Officer. He has spoken at multiple national and international meetings in four continents and his published articles in general, colorectal and academic surgery have been cited in the medical literature close to two thousand times. He continues to practice surgery in Coffs Harbour, NSW, Australia.

Early life 
Abraham was born in Alexandria, Egypt on 11 November 1961, in a conservative family of four sons. Nasar's Egypt at the time was between its second and third wars with Israel. Ned lived through The Six-Day War in June 1967 when he was five and The Yom Kippur War in October 1973 when he was eleven which probably caused Ned to develop an early passion for helping humanity and an intense desire to become a surgeon since he was eleven. He excelled in his school years and was seventeen when he was accepted into the Faculty of Medicine, University of Alexandria in Egypt in 1979.

Education, qualifications and career 
For financial reasons, Abraham had a number of failed attempts to attend university in the United Kingdom and the United States. He returned to Alexandria and completed the requirements for the degree of a Bachelor of Medicine and Surgery with Honours at The Faculty of Medicine, University of Alexandria, which he obtained in 1985. He served for one year with the mine disposal team of the Egyptian Army in 1986 disposing of World War II mines in El Alamein before leaving for the United Kingdom and then the United States for a period of time. He moved to Australia in early 1989 but spent around a year in New Zealand before returning to Australia. He commenced work as an intern and then a resident medical officer at North West Regional Hospital in Burnie and Latrobe Base Hospital (now called Mersey Community Hospital) in Tasmania in 1992.

At the end of 1993 Abraham moved to work at the Royal Darwin Hospital in the Northern Territory, before moving to work at the Royal Prince Alfred Hospital in New South Wales in January 1995 where he stayed for the next eleven years. In that time, he completed and obtained the degree of a Master of Medicine (MM) in Clinical Epidemiology from the Faculty of Medicine, University of Sydney in 1998 before commencing his training in general surgery.

He succeeded in entering the Advanced General Surgical Training Program at the Royal Prince Alfred Hospital in 1998 and became the first non-specialist overseas trained doctor from a non-English speaking country to be accepted in the general surgical training program at that hospital in its recent history.

In 1995, a year before his first son David Marcus was born, he enlisted in the Australian Army Reserve. He was posted on deployments as a ranked officer and as a civilian in Bougainville, Solomon Islands and Papua New Guinea. His second son Daniel Jonathan was born in 1998.

By coincidence and in 2003, he became the first man in history to be awarded a surgical fellowship by a woman, Mrs Anne Kolbe, who was the first female president of a college of surgeons anywhere in the world. After obtaining the Fellowship of the Royal Australasian College of Surgeons, he qualified for the Membership of the Colorectal Surgical Society of Australia and New Zealand.

At the completion of his surgical training in Australia, he was awarded the Fellowship of the Royal College of Surgeons of England by an invitation from its Vice President in 2003. He worked as the Surgical Superintendent of the Royal Prince Alfred Hospital for three years before moving to Coffs Harbour, New South Wales, where he took up a job as a Senior Lecturer in Surgery at the Faculty of Medicine, University of New South Wales, as well as public and private hospital appointments as a colorectal and general surgeon.

He studied "Evidence" then obtained the degree of a Doctor of Philosophy (PhD) in Surgery from the University of Sydney in 2008. In 2009, he became the first clinical academic to be promoted to the level of an Associate Professor in the eleven-year history of the Rural Medical School, UNSW Australia.

In 2020, he resigned from the public hospital after publicly revealing what he considered to be serious shortcomings in the healthcare system which caught significant media attention.

In 2021, he published his first book about bullying and harassment in the healthcare system (The Clinical Justice System). In 2022, he published his second book on the origins of life and of the universe (Simple Answers to the Big Questions). In 2023, he published his third book about dishonesty in science (Scientific Lies).

Publications and research 
Abraham published more than forty articles and abstracts and given more than forty presentations at national and international meetings in Australia, New Zealand, China, Singapore, Croatia, Italy, Thailand and the United States. His published work has been cited in the medical literature close to two thousand times. He designed, conducted and published systematic reviews, case control studies, a surgical randomised controlled clinical trial, a prospective clinical trial and a cohort study.

He conducted and wrote the first published systematic review of reasons for non-entry of eligible patients into surgical randomised trials, the first published prospective study of reasons for non-entry of eligible patients into a surgical randomised trial, the first surgical randomised control trial to have ever been conducted at the Royal Darwin Hospital, the first published prospective comparative study of myocardial injuries following repair of aortic aneurysms before any randomised trials were conducted on the issue, the first published meta-analysis of non-randomised comparative studies of a surgical procedure, the first published direct comparison between a randomised trial and a historical control study of a surgical procedure, the first published meta-analysis of the short term outcomes after laparoscopic resection for colon cancer and the first published direct comparison between a meta-analysis of randomised and non-randomised studies of a surgical procedure.

He was interviewed by ABC Radio NSW and 2CS Radio three times, the Sydney Morning Herald, The Financial Review and by National Channel 7 News about ten times promoting local and national health issues between 2007 and 2013 and his correspondence was tabled in the NSW Parliament in May 2008.

An article published in 2018 ranked one of Abraham's publications as being one of Laparoscopic Surgery's 100 Most Influential Manuscripts of all time

Awards 
He was granted the Award of Best Papers presented at Surgical Grand Rounds by the Division of Surgery at Royal Prince Alfred Hospital in 1997, The Trevor Taylor Prize of the Staff Specialist Committee & Management Board, Royal Darwin Hospital twice, in 1994 and in 1995 and The Patron's Prize by the Medical Board of Royal Prince Alfred Hospital in 1995.

Fellowships 
 Fellow of the Royal Australasian College of Surgeons
 Fellow of the Royal College of Surgeons of England (September 2004)
 Member of the Colorectal Surgical Society of Australia & New Zealand – CSSANZ
 Member of the Section of Colon and Rectal Surgery, RACS
 Member of General Surgeons Australia – GSA
 Member of the NSW & ACT Regional Subcommittee Board in General Surgery
 Supervisor of Basic & Advanced Surgical Training (Retired)
 Member of Oncology Group (Colorectal) of the NSW Cancer Institute

Personal life 
Abraham has two sons.

Selected works 
 
 
 Ho-Shon K. Waugh R. Abraham N. Solomon M. Angiographic Intervention in the Diagnosis and Treatment of Acute Unstable Lower GI Haemorrhage – A Retrospective Study. Australasian Radiology. 47(2):A7-9, June 2003.
 
 Abstract: The Short Term Outcomes of laparoscopic colectomy for colorectal cancer; a meta-analysis. Abraham N.S. ANZ Journal of Surgery, June 2004
 
 
 
 Abraham N.S. Hewett P. Young J.M. Solomon M.J. Non-entry of eligible patients into the Australasian Laparoscopic Colon Cancer Study. ANZ Journal of Surgery. 76(9):825-829, 2006.
 
 
 Abraham N.S. Thesis for the Degree of Doctor of Philosophy (PhD) in Surgery, Faculty of Medicine of The University of Sydney: "A methodological assessment of non-randomised comparative studies as an alternative to the difficult-to-conduct randomised control trials of surgical procedures using the example of laparoscopic colorectal surgery" 2008.
 
 Article "Five-year results show keyhole bowel cancer surgery is safe and effective" Health and ageing news University of Leeds Online Article published 4 November 2010 http://www.leeds.ac.uk/news/article/1196/five-year_results_show_keyhole_bowel_cancer_surgery_is_safe_and_effective
 
 Ned Abraham: Do we really need randomized trials to assess colorectal cancer surgical procedures? Poster abs#254 Tripartite Colorectal Meeting 2011, Cairns, Queensland, Australia, 3–7 July

References 

1961 births
Alexandria University alumni
Australian Army officers
Australian Fellows of the Royal College of Surgeons
Egyptian emigrants to Australia
Egyptian surgeons
Fellows of the Royal Australasian College of Surgeons
Living people
People from Alexandria
Academic staff of the University of New South Wales
University of Sydney alumni